Utaperla is a genus of green stoneflies in the family Chloroperlidae. There are at least four described species in Utaperla.

Species
These four species belong to the genus Utaperla:
 Utaperla gaspesiana Harper & Roy, 1975 (Gaspe sallfly)
 Utaperla lepnevae (Zhiltzova, 1970)
 Utaperla orientalis Nelson & Hanson, 1969
 Utaperla sopladora Ricker, 1952

References

Further reading

 
 

Chloroperlidae
Articles created by Qbugbot